Football was contested for men only at the 1974 Central American and Caribbean Games in Santo Domingo, Dominican Republic. All matches took place at the newly constructed Félix Sánchez Olympic Stadium.

The gold medal was won by Cuba for the second time, who defeated Trinidad and Tobago in the final on penalties after a 1-1 draw.

Qualifying Tournament

The 1973 Central American Games was the first of its kind and all games took place in Guatemala between 24 November and 2 December 1973, for U-21 teams. The tournament was won by Panama's U-21 side, with the second-placed team being Nicaragua, hence assuring qualification for the 1974 Central American and Caribbean Games.

First stage

Group A
A 2 point system used.

Does not include the annulled result between Trinidad and Tobago and Barbados, but Trinidad and Tobago still qualified on goal difference.

Group 2
A 2 point system used.

Mexico won the group by lot.

Final stage

Semi-finals

Third-place match

Final

Statistics

Goalscorers

References

External links
 

1974 Central American and Caribbean Games
1974